Apsley Road Playground is a park and playground situated in South Norwood, London, England. The park is mainly located on Apsley Road which is also the main entrance for the park. It is more targeted to the surrounding residential area. The playground's nearest Tramlink stop is Harrington Road.

Facilities 
In the playground there is children's play equipment. At night the playground is locked.

History 
The site was purchased by the Borough of Croydon in 1946 for the purpose of building a children's playground and was previously a property known as 15 Apsley Road.

The children's playground was created in 1951. An air raid shelter at the rear of 15 Apsley Road was removed in 1973.

See also
List of Parks and Open Spaces in Croydon
South Norwood Country Park
Croydon Sports Arena

References

External links
Croydon Council — Apsley Road Playground
Croydon Council — History

Parks and open spaces in the London Borough of Croydon
1951 establishments in England
Playgrounds